Jude Davies (born 19 February 1965) is a British American studies scholar who is Professor of American Literature and Culture in the Department of English, Creative Writing and American Studies at the University of Winchester. His research concerns American literature (especially the work of Theodore Dreiser), post-1990 American cinema, editing, and Americanisation.

Davies was educated at University College London and the University of York. His published work includes 1997's Gender, Ethnicity, and Sexuality in Contemporary American Film, co-authored with Carol R. Smith; 2001's Diana, A Cultural History: Gender, Race, Nation and the People's Princess; 2004's Issues in Americanisation and Culture, which he co-edited with  Neil Campbell and George McKay; a 2011 collection of Dreiser's political writing; and Falling Down, a 2013 book about the film of the same name.

References

American studies scholars
Academics of the University of Winchester
Alumni of the University of York
Alumni of University College London
1965 births
Living people
British academics of English literature
Film educators